The Knesset Channel (Arutz Knesset, "Knesset Channel") is a public Israeli terrestrial channel that broadcasts the sessions of the Knesset as well as some other programs concerning the Israeli parliament.

Prior to the establishment of the Knesset Channel in 2004, the Knesset programming were produced by the Israel Broadcasting Authority and were relayed in its Channel 33 (Israel).

It is available via digital terrestrial broadcast and via open satellite. It is also relayed in the TV-subscribing companies: digital cable channel 99, analog cable channel 41, yes channel 99.
Satellite reception details:
Orbital location: 4°W (AMOS-3 satellite)
Central Frequency: 11,625 MHz
Polarization: Vertical
Signal Ratio: 3000
FEC: 3/4
Azimuth to satellite: 236° (in Israel)
Elevation to satellite: 34.1° (in Israel)

It is also available on the internet.
The channel is operated by RGE, and until 2020 it was operated by Channel 2 News.

Presenters
Daniel Ben-Simon
Emmanuel Halperin
Tom Segev

External links

 

Knesset
Television channels in Israel
Television channels and stations established in 2004
2004 establishments in Israel
Israel Broadcasting Authority
Public broadcasting in Israel